Simon Gavinet is a former French slalom canoeist who competed in the 1940s and the 1950s. He won two gold medals in the C-2 team event at the ICF Canoe Slalom World Championships, earning them in 1949 and 1953.

References

French male canoeists
Living people
Year of birth missing (living people)
Medalists at the ICF Canoe Slalom World Championships